JAIS may refer to:
 Journal of Arabic and Islamic Studies
 Journal of the Association for Information Systems
 Jerusalem American International School
 Jais, Amethi, a town in India